This is a partial list of notable Reformed Baptists. Reformed Baptists are those who hold to the 1689 London Baptists Confession, the doctrines within it, and/or one of the subsequent confessions based on it.

17th Century 
John Bunyan (1628–1688): English preacher and author of The Pilgrim's Progress
Hercules Collins (d. 1702): English Pastor, author of An Orthodox Catechism, and signer of the 1689 London Baptist Confession
Benjamin Coxe: English Pastor and theologian, signer of the First London Baptist Confession, father of Nehemiah Coxe
Nehemiah Coxe: English Pastor and signer of the 1689 London Baptist Confession, son of Benjamin Coxe
Anne Dutton (1692–1765): English poet and associate of John Wesley and George Whitefield
Benjamin Keach (1640–1704): English theologian, pastor of Metropolitan Tabernacle, writer of Keach's Catechism, signer of the 1689 London Baptist Confession
Roger Williams (1603–1683): American minister and founder of Rhode Island. Williams later left the Reformed Baptists.

18th Century 

William Carey (1761–1834): English missionary
William Gadsby (1773–1844): an early leader of the Strict and Particular Baptist movement in England.
Andrew Fuller (1754–1815): founder of the Baptist Missionary Society
John Gill (1697–1771): English theologian and pastor of Metropolitan Tabernacle
Adoniram Judson (1788–1850): first Protestant missionary sent from North America to preach in Burma

19th Century 

 Charles Spurgeon (1834–1892): English author and pastor of Metropolitan Tabernacle

20th Century

21st Century 

 Thomas Ascol (b. 1957): American author, Pastor of Grace Baptist Church in Cape Coral, FL, President of Founders Ministry
 Voddie Baucham (b. 1969): American theologian, Former Pastor of Grace Family Baptist Church in Spring, TX, Professor at African Christian University in Lusaka, Zambia. Moved to Zambia in 2015.  
 Mark Dever (b. 1960): American Reformed Baptist, Pastor of Capital Hill Baptist Church, and founder of 9Marks Ministry
 Peter Masters: British author and Pastor of the Metropolitan Tabernacle, London, UK
 Conrad Mbewe: Zambian Pastor of Kabwata Baptist Church and Professor at African Christian University in Lusaka, Zambia. Often referred to as, "The Spurgeon of Africa."
 James Renihan: American theologian, author, and President of IRBS Theological Seminary, Father of Samuel Renihan
 Rachael Denhollander (b. 1984): American attorney and former gymnast known for being the first woman to publicly accuse Larry Nassar of sexual assault. Rachael's husband, Jacob, is a Canadian Reformed Baptist attending seminary at Southern Baptist Theological Seminary.
 Samuel Renihan: America theologian, author, and Pastor of Trinity Reformed Baptist Church in La Mirada, CA
 Sam Waldron: American theologian, author, Pastor at Grace Reformed Baptist Church in Owensboro, KY, and President of Covenant Baptist Theological Seminary
 James White (b. 1962): American Apologist, Author, and Pastor at Apologia Church

Non-Confessional Calvinistic Baptists 
Some definitions of "Reformed Baptist" do not include non-confessional Calvinistic Baptists.

 Alistair Begg (b. 1952): Scottish-American pastor and author, host of the Truth for Life radio program 
 D. A. Carson (b. 1946): Canadian-American theologian and New Testament scholar
 Matt Chandler (b. 1974): American pastor and President of the Acts 29 Network
 Wayne Grudem (b. 1948): American theologian and author 
 Albert Mohler (b. 1959): American theologian and president of the Southern Baptist Theological Seminary
 John Piper (b. 1946): American preacher and author 
 David Platt (b. 1979): American pastor and former President of the International Mission Board

References

Reformed Baptists
Reformed Baptists
Reformed Baptists